James Bettcher (born May 27, 1978) is an American football coach who is the linebackers coach for the Cincinnati Bengals of the National Football League (NFL). He previously served as the defensive coordinator for the Arizona Cardinals and New York Giants.

Coaching career

College
Bettcher began his coaching career in 2004 as special teams coordinator & defensive line coach for Saint Francis (IN). He then served as a graduate assistant for Bowling Green, before holding positions for North Carolina, Ball State and New Hampshire.

NFL
After coaching at numerous colleges, Bettcher was hired by the Indianapolis Colts of the NFL. He coached under Bruce Arians when Arians was interim head coach of the Colts. When Arians was hired by the Cardinals as head coach, Bettcher followed him to Arizona. After defensive coordinator Todd Bowles left to become head coach of the New York Jets, Bettcher was promoted to take his place. As defensive coordinator the Cardinals never finished below 7tg in the league in overall defense. After the retirement of head coach Bruce Arians, Bettcher was seen as the most likely successor, even bringing in a plan for a coaching staff that included Mike McCoy as offensive coordinator and Chuck Pagano as defensive coordinator. However, the Cardinals opted to hire former Carolina Panthers defensive coordinator, Steve Wilks, instead.

On January 23, 2018, Bettcher was hired by the New York Giants to serve as defensive coordinator under head coach Pat Shurmur. Betcher was not retained for the 2020 season by new Giants head coach Joe Judge who instead hired Patrick Graham.

In 2021 he was hired by the San Francisco 49ers as a defensive assistant.

References

External links
New York Giants bio

1978 births
Living people
Indianapolis Colts coaches
Arizona Cardinals coaches
Saint Francis Cougars football coaches
National Football League defensive coordinators
New York Giants coaches
Bowling Green Falcons football coaches
North Carolina Tar Heels football coaches
Ball State Cardinals football coaches
New Hampshire Wildcats football coaches
Cincinnati Bengals coaches